The 1932 North Carolina gubernatorial election was held on November 8, 1932. Democratic nominee John C. B. Ehringhaus defeated Republican nominee Clifford C. Frazier with 70.07% of the vote. At the time, Ehringhaus was an attorney and former state legislator; Frazier was an attorney, based in Greensboro.

Primary elections
Primary elections were held on June 4, 1932.

Democratic primary

Candidates
John C. B. Ehringhaus, former State Representative
Richard T. Fountain, incumbent Lieutenant Governor
Allen J. Maxwell, North Carolina Commissioner of Revenue

Results

General election

Candidates
John C. B. Ehringhaus, Democratic
Clifford C. Frazier, Republican

Results

The result was a landslide victory for Ehringhaus, coming as the state, and the nation, elected Democrat Franklin D. Roosevelt as president. Ehringhaus won "the largest majority accorded a Democratic nominee [for Governor of North Carolina] up to that time."

References

1932
North Carolina
Gubernatorial